β-Homoleucine, also known as 3-amino-5-methylhexanoic acid, belongs to a class of unusual amino acids known as β-homo amino acids or beta amino acids. The more common α-analogues of these amino acids are present in greater quantities and make up most polypeptides in a cell.  β-Amino acids, however, can also be found in nature and bound to polypeptides, although at a reduced frequency. β-Homoleucine can exists as either of two enantiomers, D-β-homoleucine and L-β-homoleucine, with L-β-homoleucine being the more common isomer.  β-Homoleucine hydrochloride is the hydrochloride salt of the amino acid.

Properties
Homolecuine shares many of the same properties as its α-analogue leucine. Some notable differences include being remarkably stable to metabolism, exhibiting slow microbial degradation, and being inherently stable to proteases and peptidases, as well as folding into well-ordered secondary structures consisting of helices, turns, and sheets.

References

Amino acid derivatives